The Combate Global is an American mixed martial arts (MMA) organization.

Each fight record has four categories: wins, losses, draws, and no-contests (NC). All fight records in this article are displayed in that order, with fights resulting in a no-contest listed in parentheses.

Welterweight (170 Ib, 77.1 kg)

Lightweight (155 Ib, 70.3 kg)

Featherweight (145 Ib, 65.8 kg)

Bantamweight (135 Ib, 61.2 kg)

Flyweight (125 Ib, 56.7 kg)

Women Flyweight (125 Ib, 56.7 kg)

Women Strawweight (115 Ib, 52.2 kg)

Women Atomweight (105 Ib, 48 kg)

References

See also
List of current Combate Global Champions
List of current UFC fighters 
List of current ACA fighters
List of current Bellator fighters
List of current Brave CF fighters
List of current KSW fighters
List of current ONE fighters
List of current Invicta FC fighters
List of current PFL fighters
List of current Rizin FF fighters
List of current Road FC fighters

Lists of mixed martial artists